The Duo Alterno is an Italian voice-piano chamber ensemble specializing in 20th century and contemporary classical music. The Duo made up of soprano Tiziana Scandaletti and composer-pianist Riccardo Piacentini.

Duo Alterno's made its debut in February 1997 at the Vancouver Italian Contemporary Music Festival, where it held concerts and masterclasses for the University of British Columbia, the Simon Fraser University and the Vancouver Academy of Music. Since then they have performed in the major Italian festivals and in more than forty countries, including Europe, North America, South America, Asia and Australia, through concerts, masterclasses and CDs.

Recent performances
Recent international performances include: 
  University of California in Berkeley
  Stanford University
  Lincoln Performance Hall of Portland-Oregon
  Gasteig of Munich
  Xinghai Concert Hall of Canton
  Liaoning Grand Theatre of Shenyang
  Opera Ballet Theatre of Ulan Bator
  BKA Theater of Berlin
  University of New Mexico of Albuquerque
  SoundaXis Festival of Toronto
  MITO Festival of Turin and Milan
  Mozart Festival of Rovereto
  Sydney Conservatorium
  Federation Hall in Melbourne
  IIC in Beijing
  Moscow Conservatory
  Janácek Academy in Brno
  the University Theaters of Vilnius
  Riga and Kyiv (Taras Shevchenko University)
  Nuova Consonanza Festival of Rome
  Levine School of Music in Washington where The Washington Post particularly appreciated their "fine sense of comedic timing" 
  Walt Disney Concert Hall / REDCAT in Los Angeles
  the Pyatt Hall of the Vancouver Symphony Orchestra
  the Mugham Center in Baku
  the Saint Petersburg Conservatory.

CDs
 1999 - Giacomo Manzoni. Du Dunkelheit (Milan, Curci E. 11326 C.)
 1999 - Musiche dell'aurora (Turin, Italian Foundation of Photography - Rive-Gauche Concerti RG 00005)
 1999 - Shahar (Milan, Curci E. 11351 C.)
 2000 - Giorgio Federico Ghedini. Sacred Music (Turin, Nuova Era CD 7354)
 2001 - Arie condizionate (Turin, Italian Foundation of Photography - Rive-Gauche Concerti RG 00009)
 2001 - Giorgio Federico Ghedini. Canti e strambotti (Turin, Nuova Era CD 7365)
 2002 - Alfredo Casella. Liriche (Turin, Nuova Era CD 7371)
 2003 - Treni persi (Province of Turin - Rive-Gauche Concerti RG 00012)
 2004 - Franco Alfano. Liriche da Tagore (Turin, Nuova Era CD 7388)
 2004 - Mina miniera mia (Province of Turin - Rive-Gauche Concerti RG 00014)
 2004 - Musiche della Reggia di Venaria Reale (Piedmont Region - Rive-Gauche Concerti RG 00015)
 2005 - La voce contemporanea in Italia - vol. 1 (Milan, Stradivarius STR 33708)
 2006 - La voce contemporanea in Italia - vol. 2 (Milan, Stradivarius STR 33743)
 2007 - La voce contemporanea in Italia - vol. 3 (Milan, Stradivarius STR 33769)
 2007 - Italienischer Gesangsabend mit dem Duo Alterno (Graz, Steirischer Tonkünstler Bund STB 07/07)
 2009 - La voce contemporanea in Italia - vol. 4 (Milan, Stradivarius STR 33833)
 2010 - La voce crepuscolare - Notturni e Serenate del '900 (Milan, Stradivarius STR 33839)
 2011 - La voce contemporanea in Italia - vol. 5 (Milan, Stradivarius STR 33895)
 2013 - La voce contemporanea in Italia - vol. 6 (Milan, Stradivarius STR 33976)

Tours abroad Italy
Argentina (1998, 2004)
Australia (2004, 2008, 2010)
Austria (2009, 2015)
Azerbaijan (2014, 2015)
Belgium (2002, 2005)
Brazil (2012, 2016)
Canada (1997, 2003, 2008, 2009, 2013, 2014)
China (2002, 2007, 2008, 2010, 2015)
Chorea (2001)
Croatia (2015)
Czech Republic (2009, 2010, 2012, 2013)
Denmark (1999, 2008, 2016)
Ethiopia (2010)
Finland (1998, 1999, 2010, 2015)
France (2001, 2010, 2015)
Germany (2007, 2008, 2009, 2012, 2013, 2016)
Guatemala (2016)
Netherlands (2005, 2014)
Hong Kong (2011, 2015)
Hungary (2010, 2014)
Japan (2006, 2007)
Kazakhstan (2001)
India (2004)
Indonesia (2001, 2004, 2015)
Latvia (2009)
Lithuania (2009)
Macedonia (2003)
Malta (2011)
Mongolia (2007, 2010)
Norway (1999, 2002)
Peru (2012)
Russia (2005, 2009, 2014)
Singapore (2001, 2002, 2003, 2010, 2015)
Sweden (1999, 2008, 2015)
United Kingdom (2001)
United States (2000, 2003, 2005, 2006, 2007, 2008, 2009, 2010, 2012, 2013, 2014)
Turkey (2005, 2016)
Ukraine (2009)
Uzbekistan (1998, 1999)
Venezuela (2012, 2016)

Repertoire
 
  Marcello Abbado
  Franco Alfano
  Davide Anzaghi
  Victor Andrini
  Marino Baratello
  Andrea Basevi
  Giorgio Battistelli
  Umberto Bombardelli
  Cathy Berberian
  Luciano Berio
  Sonia Bo
  Giovanni Bonato
  Mauro Bortolotti
  Aldo Brizzi
  Gilberto Bosco
  Valentino Bucchi
  Sylvano Bussotti
  Curt Cacioppo
  Beatrice Campodonico
  Mauro Cardi
  Alfredo Casella
  Pieralberto Cattaneo
  Mario Cesa
  Ernest Chausson
  Fabio Cifariello Ciardi
  Giovanni Cima
  Aldo Clementi
  Alberto Colla
  Giorgio Colombo Taccani
  Azio Corghi
  Luigi Dallapiccola
  James Dashow
  Fabrizio De Rossi Re
  Leonid Desyatnikov
  Franco Donatoni
  Gaetano Donizetti
  Luigi Esposito
  Lorenzo Ferrero
  Boris Filanovski
  David Froom
  Sandro Fuga
  Stanislao Gastaldon
  Ada Gentile
  Giorgio Federico Ghedini
  Riccardo Giavina
  Giuseppe Giuliano
  Domenico Guaccero
  Giovanni Guaccero
  Adriano Guarnieri
  Richard Hermann
  Carlo Alessandro Landini
  Martin Q. Larsson
  Corrinne Lateur
  Luca Leone
  Antonello Lerda
  Paola Livorsi
  Luca Lombardi
  Bruno Maderna
  Gian Francesco Malipiero
  Giacomo Manzoni
  Giuseppe Martucci
  Marco Molteni
  Ennio Morricone
  Carlo Mosso
  Luigi Nono
  Franco Oppo
  Marcello Panni
  Goffredo Petrassi
  Riccardo Piacentini
  Carlo Pinelli
  Piera Pistono
  Biagio Putignano
  Maurice Ravel
  Lodovico Rocca
  Gioachino Rossini
  Aurelio Samorì
  Giacinto Scelsi
  Arnold Schönberg
  Salvatore Sciarrino
  Christopher Shultis
  Leone Sinigaglia
  Antonio Smareglia
  Alessandro Solbiati
  Daniela Terranova
  Francesco Paolo Tosti
  Fabio Vacchi
  Giuseppe Verdi
  Dmitri Yanov-Yanovsky
  Vittorio Zago

(Composers who have dedicated works to the Duo Alterno are in italics)

External links
 Official website
 CEMAT website
 CIDIM website

Italian classical music groups
Musical groups established in 1997
Italian musical duos